The Longwave transmitter Europe 1 is the oldest privately owned radio station in Germany, situated between  and Berus/Saar, Germany. It transmitted on 183 kHz with a power of 2,000 kilowatts a French speaking programme, Europe 1 toward France.  It was the highest power radio broadcasting transmitter in Germany. Longwave transmissions stopped on 31 December 2019.

Technical details
The transmitter used directional aerials of four guyed, insulated radio masts which are 270, 276, 280, and 282 metres high.
Furthermore, there is a backup aerial, which consists of two guyed insulated radio masts with a height of 234 metres.

Due to the strong south-west directional characteristic of the antenna, reception to the northeast of the transmitter (i.e. in the largest part of Germany) is poor or distorted.

The building, in which the transmitters are situated, has a length of 82 metres, a width of 43 metres, and a height of 16 metres.
Its surface area is 2,700 square metres and its volume 31,000 cubic metres.
In front of this building, there is a telecommunication tower, which was used for broadcasting the programme of Telesaar.

A new transmitter house with new 2x750 kW transmitter was built in 2015 next to the backup aerial, that was used until the shutdown in 2019.

On the morning of 8 August 2012 an 80 meters tall part of the 280 meters high transmitter broke down. This was caused by a ragged guy wire. The damaged mast was demolished on 19 November 2012. Mast 1 was demolished on 13 June 2013, because it was useless without mast 2.

History
The longwave transmitter traces its existence to the special state of the Saar Protectorate in the 1950s: Occupied by France in 1946, the French military authorities allowed the people to organize elections and govern themselves, becoming a Protectorate using the French Franc as money.  It was integrated to the Federal Republic of Germany in 1957 as a compromise between France and Germany, after the Saar people decided by referendum against a "special european district" status they were proposed. The transmitter was built in 1954, broadcasting since 1 January 1955, on land which is now located inside German borders.
In 1959, one of its main masts was relocated to vertical.

See also
 List of masts
 Transmitter Building Europe 1
 List of famous transmission sites
 http://www.saar-nostalgie.de/europeno1.htm

References

External links
 
 http://perso.orange.fr/tvignaud/am/e1/fr-e1.htm (French)
 http://www.skyscraperpage.com/diagrams/?b45344
 http://www.skyscraperpage.com/diagrams/?b45345
 http://www.skyscraperpage.com/diagrams/?b45346
 http://www.skyscraperpage.com/diagrams/?b45347
 http://www.skyscraperpage.com/diagrams/?b46688
 http://www.skyscraperpage.com/diagrams/?b46689
 Google maps: transmitter building

Former radio masts and towers
Radio masts and towers in Germany
Buildings and structures in Saarlouis (district)
Relocated buildings and structures
Towers completed in 1955
1955 establishments in Saar